Mandalay Convention Centre is a convention centre in Mandalay.Construction began under the time of Mayor Aung Maung and opened on November 9, 2018, under Ye Lwin. It is one of four convention centers in Myanmar.

History 
In Mandalay, only Mandalay City Hall was used when there was a big event.Later, due to the increase in users, Mayor Aung Maung decided to built a new building in September 2012 and called for a tender.The construction began in 2014 and the building was built at a cost of US$25 million.

Construction 
Mandalay Convention Center and Commercial Complex project is being built on a 14.78-acre plot of land, owned by MCDC, located on 101 Road between 70th and 72nd Streets.This project will be built in three phases. This convention center is the first phase of the project.The Mandalay Convention Center is built on 2.38 acres of land, measuring 386 feet by 305 feet and is a four-story concrete and steel structure with a floor area of 220,000 square feet.

When the new government came to power in 2016, Dr. Ye Lwin, the new mayor, inspected the project and found that the convention center was not up to standard, with only one large hall.  The floor of the multi-purpose hall on the ground floor is cracked.  Toilets are not equipped with sensors;  Prior to the completion of the construction work, the escalator was repaired and the design of the building had to be changed.

Opening

Soft Opening 
The Convention Centre was pre-opened by chief minister of Mandalay Region Ye Myint and Mayor Aung Maung on 13 March 2016.

Grand Opening 
The completed Convention Centre was opened on 9 November 2018.It was held in conjunction with the 2018 Mandalay Business Forum and Union Minister for Union Government Office and Chairman of Myanmar Investment Commission, Thaung Tun attended.Mandalay Region Chief Minister Zaw Myint Maung opened the sign of the Convention Centre.

References 

Buildings and structures in Mandalay